DTM (originally Don't Tell Mama) is an LGBT nightclub in Helsinki, Finland. Founded in 1992, it was once the largest gay club in Northern Europe. The venue was initially situated in Helsinki's Kamppi neighborhood, having since relocated twice: first, to Iso Roobertinkatu in Punavuori in 2003, and second, to Mannerheimintie in Kluuvi in 2012. Popular with gay men, DTM also caters to a straight and lesbian customer base. The club's playlists contain primarily pop songs, dance music, techno and Finnish hits, with live entertainment often taking the form of drag shows. Through an agreement with UK-based promoter Klub Kids, DTM hosted visiting performers from RuPaul's Drag Race from January 2019 to early 2020, when the Mannerheimintie venue closed.

The club temporarily ceased operation due to the COVID-19 pandemic, but following a protracted conflict over noise complaints from a neighboring hotel—which ended in June 2020—the Mannerheimintie location's rental agreement was dissolved. DTM is scheduled to reopen in summer 2023 in a new space on the outskirts of Helsinki's Kalasatama neighborhood.

Description

Owned by Äkä Oy, DTM was once the largest gay club in Northern Europe. It has relocated several times since its inception, though it has always been in the vicinity of Helsinki's downtown area. The most recent location, on Mannerheimintie, closed in June 2020. General manager Tomi Häkkinen has stated that the establishment will reopen at a new address in 2021.

The club's music selection consists mostly of "multilingual Eurovision pop tunes", English-language dance music and techno, as well as a selection of Finnish-language hits by artists such as Kaija Koo. Its live entertainment often features drag queens and go-go dancers. Each year during Pride Week, the venue hosts the finale of the Mr. Gay Finland competition, which began in 2010. International businesses, such as Nordea and Nokia, sometimes hold events and product launches there.

Since January 2019, DTM has had a partnership with Klub Kids, a European promoter that organizes continent-wide drag tours. The company produces a series of live shows called Klub Kids Helsinki, which brings RuPaul's Drag Race stars to DTM several times per year. To date, performers including Kameron Michaels, Bob the Drag Queen and Vanessa Vanjie Mateo have made appearances.

History

Background and early years
In the early 1980s, Helsinki did not have any gay restaurants or nightlife venues. Consequently, Seta, the largest LGBT rights organization in Finland, invested in a company called Ravintola Oy Afrodite. With Seta's funding, the firm opened Gay Gambrin, Helsinki's first LGBT restaurant, in 1984. Because this venture was successful, Ravintola Oy Afrodite then took over an existing nightclub, Don't Tell Mama, in 1992. Later renamed DTM, Don't Tell Mama was located at the corner of Annankatu and Kansakoulukatu in Helsinki's Kamppi neighborhood. It was the only gay club in Helsinki until 1996, when a venue called Lost & Found opened and began to compete with it for customers. DTM nevertheless maintained its reputation as Finland's flagship LGBT nightlife establishment. In 1997, the club began to host the Miss Drag Queen competition, a regularly recurring drag show that ran until 2013.

Iso Roobertinkatu location

In late 2002 or early 2003, DTM moved to Iso Roobertinkatu in Punavuori. There, it occupied a bilevel space that included bars on both floors, a cafe, and a 54-seat terrace for outdoor dining. During this period, DTM was noted for targeting a wider customer base than Hercules, another popular local gay club. Unlike the latter, DTM actively welcomed lesbians and straight clientele in addition to gay men. Its second floor was open to women only on Saturday evenings. According to Riitta Suominen, who managed DTM from 1996 to 2006, all profits the venue made under Ravintola Oy Afrodite's ownership were donated to LGBT charities and initiatives.

In December 2011, American singer Adam Lambert and his then-boyfriend Sauli Koskinen were arrested outside the club, which had ejected them for fighting.

Mannerheimintie and conflict with St. George 
After Ravintola Oy Afrodite went bankrupt in early 2012, Äkä Oy bought DTM and moved the business to Mannerheimintie. The new address, in Kluuvi, was near the Helsinki central railway station. For part of the 2010s, the establishment was managed by Markku Valtanen. In June 2018, a woman was raped in one of the club's toilet stalls. This prompted DTM's management to make structural changes to its bathrooms and to increase signage encouraging patrons to report suspicious activity. According to Häkkinen, the frequency of harassment and other inappropriate behavior in the venue subsequently decreased.

Around the same time, in May 2018, a luxury hotel called St. George opened next door. Four months later, St. George's management lodged a complaint against DTM, stating that loud music from one of its dance floors, the Puma Bar, was audible in three hotel rooms. The City of Helsinki's environmental board investigated the matter in August 2019, concluding that the noise was loud enough to prevent hotel guests from sleeping. In response, DTM modified its sound equipment and indicated that the onus for addressing any remaining concerns should be on the hotel. Nevertheless, the environmental board deemed DTM's adjustments insufficient and notified the club that it would be fined €25,000 if it did not quiet the music by the end of January 2020. DTM challenged the decision in court, but a ruling had not been made by June. In the meantime, the venue had been closed for several months due to the COVID-19 pandemic, though it continued to stream live music shows online.

After consulting with acoustics experts, the club's management learned that the only way to soundproof the Puma Bar enough to shield hotel patrons from the noise would be to reconstruct the area as a room within a room, which would have been prohibitively expensive. Because of this, they decided that the only viable solution was to move. They dissolved the Mannerheimintie rental agreement in late June, announcing together with the establishment's closure that it would reopen pending the procurement of a new space.

Move to Kalasatama

In January 2023, Helsingin Sanomat reported that DTM is scheduled to reopen in the Teurastamo area of Helsinki's Kalasatama neighborhood in summer 2023.

Reception
In an interview with Gay Star News, Terry Miller of the Tom of Finland Store described DTM as "a great place to go party and feel comfortable with your community", further classifying it as "the closest to a traditional gay club as you're going to get" in Finland. He stated to NewNowNext that the venue is "Helsinki's premier LGBTQ disco/bar". Helsingin Uutiset, a local Helsinki newspaper, called DTM "legendary".

References

External links

 

1992 establishments in Finland
Culture in Helsinki
LGBT culture in Finland
Nightclubs in Finland